The US Pro Golf Tour was a developmental men's professional golf tour in the United States owned by Greens Worldwide Incorporated. Early in 2007, the tour was suspended due to financial problems, leaving hundreds of players out of pocket having paid thousands of dollars in membership and tournament entry fees. 

The highest level of men's professional golf in the United States is the PGA Tour, with the second level being the Nationwide Tour, which is the PGA Tour's official developmental tour. Below that sat the US Pro Golf Tour, which ran alongside rival third level tours such as the Gateway Tour and the NGA Pro Golf Tour. The players main objective on these tours is to perform as well as possible, in order to attract invitations to events on the higher level tours.

References

Professional golf tours
Golf in the United States